Pitara is a genus of moths of the family Erebidae. The genus was erected by Francis Walker in 1858.

Species
Pitara congressa (Walker, 1858) Venezuela
Pitara subaracuata Walker, 1865 Sierra Leone
Pitara subcosta Walker, 1858 Brazil (Amazonas)

References

Calpinae